The 8"/45 caliber Mark 6 gun (spoken "eight-inch-forty-five--caliber") were used for the secondary batteries of the United States Navy's last pre-dreadnought battleships and refitted in older armored cruisers main batteries.

Design
The /45 caliber gun was developed after the Spanish–American War to use the new smokeless powder that had recently been adopted by the Navy. This gun was much stronger than its predecessor, the 8-inch/40 caliber gun, which were incapable of handling the new powder. This was shown when the muzzle of one of s guns blew off on 22 June 1907, during gunnery practice off Shantung. The Mark 6, gun Nos. 108–255, 148 in total, was constructed of tube, jacket, four hoops a locking ring and the liner with a Welin breech block. These were all constructed of nickel steel. There were a tolal of eight different Mods, Mark 6 Mod 0 to Mark 6 Mod 7, with different liners, breech mechanisms, chambers, and rifling being used.

Service history
The guns mounted in the Virginia-class battleships were in an unusual two-level turret with the 8-inch guns on top of the larger  guns. This arrangement ultimately proved unsuccessful but helped the Navy in the successful development of superfiring turrets later used in the dreadnought .

Because of this, all  armored cruisers and the armored cruiser , were refit with the newer Mark 6 guns.

With the signing of the Washington Naval Treaty, the pre-dreadnoughts still in service were required to be scrapped. This surplussed up to 48 guns, which the Army used for coastal artillery, using new mountings and new lighter, and more streamlined, projectiles.

Naval Service

Coast defense service

Up to 48 of these weapons served as coast defense weapons with the United States Army Coast Artillery Corps in World War II. They were designated "8-inch Navy gun Mk.VI M3A2". Twenty-four to thirty-two of these weapons were on the M1 railway mounting, divided into four-gun batteries, stationed in Delaware, Los Angeles, and Puget Sound, among other CONUS locations. Sixteen additional weapons were mounted in two-gun batteries in fixed emplacements on the M1 barbette carriage, with some additional batteries not completed. Most of the fixed weapons were in Alaska, Hawaii, and Puerto Rico.

Surviving Examples
Four weapons of this type survive, all previously used in coast defense:
 One gun at Fort Miles, Delaware, on M1 railway proof mount (experimentally bored out to ) (was previously at Naval Surface Warfare Center Dahlgren Division, Dahlgren, VA
 Two 8-inch Guns Mk VI M3A2 (#160L2 & #154L2), Battery 404, Fort Abercrombie, Kodiak, AK
 One 8-inch Gun Mk VI M3A2 (#134L2), Kodiak Airport, Kodiak, AK (gun formerly at Battery 403, Fort J.H. Smith, Kodiak, AK)

Notes

References

Books
 
 
Online sources

External links

 Bluejackets Manual, 1917, 4th revision: US Navy 14-inch Mark 1 gun

Naval guns of the United States
203 mm artillery